Beverly Beach is a town in Flagler County, Florida, United States. The population was 338 at the 2010 census, down from 547 in 2000. It is part of the Deltona–Daytona Beach–Ormond Beach, FL metropolitan statistical area.

Geography
Beverly Beach is located in eastern Flagler County at  (29.517881, −81.148411). It is bordered to the north by the unincorporated community of Painters Hill and to the south by the city of Flagler Beach. The western border follows the Intracoastal Waterway, and the eastern border is the Atlantic Ocean. Florida State Road A1A passes through the town, leading south  to Daytona Beach and north  to St. Augustine.

Demographics

As of the census of 2000, there were 547 people, 312 households, and 174 families residing in the town. The racial makeup of the town was 96.71% White, 0.18% African American, 0.73% Native American, 0.18% Asian, and 2.19% from two or more races. Hispanic or Latino of any race were 0.18% of the population.

There were 312 households, out of which 7.4% had children under the age of 18 living with them, 47.4% were married couples living together, 5.8% had a female householder with no husband present, and 44.2% were non-families. 41.3% of all households were made up of individuals, and 22.1% had someone living alone who was 65 years of age or older.  The average household size was 1.75 and the average family size was 2.26.

In the town, the population was spread out, with 6.6% under the age of 18, 2.9% from 18 to 24, 11.7% from 25 to 44, 33.3% from 45 to 64, and 45.5% who were 65 years of age or older.  The median age was 63 years. For every 100 females, there were 89.3 males.  For every 100 females age 18 and over, there were 85.8 males.

The median income for a household in the town was $26,667, and the median income for a family was $34,167. Males had a median income of $30,250 versus $24,583 for females. The per capita income for the town was $19,488.  About 11.5% of families and 8.7% of the population were below the poverty line, including 10.7% of those under age 18 and 4.2% of those age 65 or over.

References

External links
Town of Beverly Beach official website

Towns in Flagler County, Florida
Beaches of Florida
Towns in Florida
Populated coastal places in Florida on the Atlantic Ocean
Beaches of Flagler County, Florida